Collemataria is an extinct genus of brachiopods from the Permian.

References

 Dinosaurs to Dodos: An Encyclopedia of Extinct Animals by Don Lessem and Jan Sovak

Permian animals of South America
Permian animals of North America
Permian animals of Europe
Permian brachiopods
Prehistoric brachiopod genera
Productida